Operation: Endgame is a 2010 black action comedy film directed by Fouad Mikati featuring an ensemble cast. It premiered on November 5, 2009, at the American Film Market and had a limited release in the United States on July 16, 2010. It was released on DVD and Blu-ray Disc on July 27, 2010.

Plot
The majority of the events in the film take place on January 20, 2009, the date of the inauguration of Barack Obama as President of the United States and the first day of work for "The Fool", as the film's main character is code-named. The Factory, a secret office of government agents, has hired him as a thief. After the beautiful High Priestess and the caustic Chariot meet the Fool, they enter the secret underground offices of the Factory, and the audience learns that Neal, Carl, and their boss Susan have the entire office under surveillance.

The Factory is separated into two teams, Alpha and Omega. The two teams specialize in black ops and oppose each other in a bureaucratic system of checks and balances. Omega Team consists of the Fool, Chariot, High Priestess, Judgement (who repeats his name whenever he can), and the Emperor. Alpha Team consists of the Fool's old flame, Temperance, the Empress, Magician, Tower, and Hierophant. The head of the Factory is the Devil. The wildcard of the office is the Hermit, an extremely dangerous assassin with diabetes and occasional irritable bowel syndrome.

Not long after the Fool is introduced to everyone, Alpha and Omega find that the Devil has been murdered, and also that he has initiated Project Endgame, which has trapped both teams underground and triggered a bomb that threatens to destroy the Factory and kill everyone. The agents need to find a way out. They decide to work in pairs with their opposing mirror agents to escape.

As they explore the office, members of Alpha Team begin to kill their Omega Team counterparts in gruesome fashion, with Empress killing Emperor with a staple remover, Hierophant killing Judgement by hitting him in the head with a table leg with nails protruding out, and Tower stabbing High Priestess in the throat with a metal bookend.  Shortly after Tower is killed by Chariot who smashes his face repeatedly with a paper shredder, and then Chariot is almost killed by Magician. Back in the surveillance room, Carl, Neil, and Susan watch the carnage between the agents. But they all learn that the system has been corrupted, and Susan realizes that the clearance codes have been switched in conjunction with the inauguration.

While trying to find a way out, Fool is attacked by Hierophant but is saved by Temperance, who kills her by hitting her repeatedly in the back with the blade of a paper cutter. She reveals to him that Alpha Team was ordered to eliminate Omega Team that very day. The Fool, Chariot and Temperance spend time in Devil's Office trying to find a way of escape. Eventually Devil's Safe is cracked open, a map is found and The Fool mysteriously steals some discs  without anyone else noticing. After this encounter, the trio face off against the remaining members of Alpha: The Empress, Magician and the mysterious Hermit. After more fighting and kills, such as Chariot setting Magician on fire, Hermit killing Chariot by throwing a pair of scissors into his eye and Temperance shooting Hermit in the crotch with her lipstick gun and then killing Empress by shoving a water cooler bottle down her throat causing her to drown, the Fool and Temperance are the only ones left standing. They both enter the exit elevator and escape. They kiss as the bomb goes off, destroying the Factory.

Meanwhile, Carl and Neil uncover an audio tape which the Devil recorded before his death. The Devil reveals that he has a disc with every dirty secret from the last eight years of the Bush administration. He also professes his love for Susan. The elevator emerges from a bathroom stall and it is revealed the Fool has killed Temperance, the paper cutter blade stuck in her head. He snaps the neck of a man in the bathroom who sees Temperance's body and takes his jacket, then he calls Susan, and tells her (in an English accent using the British pronunciation of ma'am as the American sound of "mom") that he has the disc, which contains "every single one of their fuck-ups." Susan reveals that she had hired the Fool specifically to enter the Factory and retrieve the files. She then shoots Carl and Neil. The film ends with the Fool confidently walking out of the building, stepping into a cab, and driving off and the screen turns black. In the credits, bits of a will, one recorded by Emperor and the other by Chariot, reveal that Emperor plans to leave his holiday home to his dog and give wine in his wine cellar to the widows of the men he killed, while Chariot promises that he will return as an evil ghost and will eat hearts for an eternity.

Cast
 Joe Anderson as Fool
 Odette Yustman as Temperance
 Adam Scott as Magician
 Zach Galifianakis as The Hermit
 Emilie de Ravin as Hierophant
 Maggie Q as High Priestess
 Ving Rhames as Judgement
 Ellen Barkin as Empress
 Bob Odenkirk as Emperor
 Rob Corddry as Chariot
 Brandon T. Jackson as Tower
 Jeffrey Tambor as Devil

Production
Filming took place in Los Angeles.

The original screenplay, The Rogues Gallery, was written by Brian Watanabe. The script tied for "Best Comedy" at the Screenwriting Expo 3 Screenwriting Contest and 2nd place at the 1st Screenplay Shootout. It was also a 2004 Scriptapalooza finalist.

References

External links
 
 
 
 

2010 films
2010 action comedy films
American comedy thriller films
American mystery films
American black comedy films
American action thriller films
American action comedy films
Films about security and surveillance
Films about computing
Films set in 2009
Techno-thriller films
Films shot in Los Angeles
2010 comedy films
2010s English-language films
2010s American films